La Tele was a regional television network in Venezuela. It could be seen on the cable and satellite systems of DirecTV (channel 113 in all of Venezuela), Supercable (channels 49, 48, 49, 49, 48, and 44 in Caracas, Margarita Island, Maracay, Puerto Ordaz, Puerto la Cruz, and Maturín, respectively), Intercable (channel five in Caracas), and Net Uno (channel 68 in Caracas).

History
La Tele was created by a group of communication companies and began its testing phase under the name Canal 12 on December 1, 2002 (which coincidentally happened to be the day before the beginning of the Venezuelan general strike against President Hugo Chávez).  It had taken over the signal of channel 12 from the defunct Marte TV.  La Tele was officially inaugurated on August 3, 2003 at 8pm.  Originally, eighty percent of La Tele's programming were imports.  La Tele's slogan is Soy la Tele (I am La Tele), but it has also used the slogans Somos La Tele (We Are La Tele) and Señal de Cambio (Signal of Change).

Programming

References

External links
Detailed history of television in Venezuela 

2002 establishments in Venezuela
2015 disestablishments in Venezuela
Defunct television channels and networks in Venezuela
Spanish-language television stations
Television channels and stations established in 2002
Television channels and stations disestablished in 2015
Television stations in Venezuela
Television networks in Venezuela